Ziggeo is a cloud-based video technology SaaS (software as a service) company that provides asynchronous video APIs, mobile SDKs and tools to deliver enterprise-grade WebRTC capabilities.

Ziggeo is the initiator and backer of BetaJS, an open-source framework. It also launched Video Hack Day. Ziggeo is headquartered in New York City.

History 
Ziggeo was founded by Susan Danziger and Oliver Friedmann in 2013. It launched the same year as a recruitment platform, and then pivoted in 2014 to a general video recording API provider that supports a variety of use cases and partners. Ziggeo is backed by Albert Wenger of Union Square Ventures.

Ziggeo's API for Video Recording and Playback won the API: World Award for its Music/Video API in 2016 and 2017. Ziggeo was a finalist for the SaaS Award in HR / Recruitment and was a finalist for the SAAS Award in Non-Profits / Education in 2017.

In August 2022, Ziggeo was acquired by Kargo, an ad-tech firm, for an undisclosed sum.

References

External links
Official Website
Tally On Cloud

WebRTC
Cloud_applications